Lycus arizonensis is a species of net-winged beetle in the family Lycidae. It is found in North America.

Description
Members of this species are amber in color with black-tipped elytra. Males of this species tend to be slightly smaller than the females.

Distribution
This species typically occurs in the Southwestern United States.

References

Further reading

 

Lycidae
Articles created by Qbugbot
Beetles described in 1949